Polymerurus is a genus of gastrotrichs belonging to the family Chaetonotidae.

The genus has almost cosmopolitan distribution.

Species:

Polymerurus andreae 
Polymerurus biroi 
Polymerurus callosus

References

Gastrotricha